Guillfred Francis Besaril (born 9 January 1974) is an Aruban politician of the People's Electoral Movement. He has been Minister Plenipotentiary of Aruba since 20 November 2017. He previously served in the Estates of Aruba between 2013 and November 2017, the last month as president.

Career
Besaril was born in Savaneta. After attending high school he joined the Aruba Police Force in 1993. Besaril worked for the force until 2013. Between 2009 and 2013 Besaril was chairman of the Aruban Police Force union.

In the 2013 general election Besaril was elected with 833 votes to the Estates of Aruba for the People's Electoral Movement. In November 2014 Besaril filed a police report against two Aruban People's Party politicians, for claims they made against him in the Estates.

During the 2017 general election Besaril was elected to the Estates with 503 votes. On 27 October he was elected President of the Estates. In the government of Evelyn Wever-Croes, Besaril was named Minister Plenipotentiary of Aruba. He succeeded Juan David Yrausquin on 20 November 2017.

References

1974 births
Living people
Aruban police officers
Members of the Estates of Aruba
Ministers plenipotentiary (Aruba)
People's Electoral Movement (Aruba) politicians
Presidents of the Estates of Aruba